The 2008–09 Indiana Pacers season was Indiana's 42nd season as a franchise and 33rd season in the NBA.

Key dates
 June 26: The 2008 NBA draft took place in Madison Square Garden, New York.
 July 1: The free agency period started.

Offseason
On July 9 the Pacers officially announced they had made two trades, the most notable being the trade of former All Star forward Jermaine O'Neal in exchange for Toronto Raptors players T. J. Ford, Rasho Nesterovic, Maceo Baston and Roy Hibbert who was the 17th pick on the 2008 NBA draft. The Raptors also received Nathan Jawai who was the 41st pick in the draft. Also in a trade with the Portland Trail Blazers, the Pacers acquired Jarrett Jack, Josh McRoberts and Brandon Rush who was the 13th pick in the draft. The Pacers traded away Ike Diogu and Jerryd Bayless who was the 11th pick in the draft. With the Pacers missing the playoffs for the last two seasons and reaching just the first round before that, a change was needed in Indianapolis. Having been with the Pacers for the past eight years, O'Neal's tenure was marred by numerous injuries which saw him miss 40 games last season and 31 during the 2005–06 season.

Draft picks

 The 6-foot-10 Nathan Jawai is the first indigenous player from Australia to be drafted by an NBA team.

Roster

Regular season

Standings

Game log

|- bgcolor="#ffcccc"
| 1
| October 29
| @ Detroit
| 
| Danny Granger (33)
| Troy Murphy (15)
| T. J. Ford (5)
| The Palace of Auburn Hills22,076
| 0–1

|- bgcolor="#bbffbb"
| 2
| November 1
| Boston
| 
| Danny Granger (20)
| Marquis Daniels (10)
| Troy Murphy (5)
| Conseco Fieldhouse18,165
| 1–1
|- bgcolor="#ffcccc"
| 3
| November 5
| Phoenix
| 
| T. J. Ford, Danny Granger (23)
| Troy Murphy (10)
| Troy Murphy (4)
| Conseco Fieldhouse11,660
| 1–2
|- bgcolor="#ffcccc"
| 4
| November 7
| @ Cleveland
| 
| Danny Granger (33)
| Marquis Daniels (11)
| Marquis Daniels (7)
| Quicken Loans Arena20,562
| 1–3
|- bgcolor="#bbffbb"
| 5
| November 8
| New Jersey
| 
| Danny Granger (23)
| Jeff Foster (13)
| T. J. Ford (9)
| Conseco Fieldhouse14,355
| 2–3
|- bgcolor="#bbffbb"
| 6
| November 10
| Oklahoma City
| 
| T. J. Ford (24)
| T. J. Ford, Danny Granger (7)
| T. J. Ford (10)
| Conseco Fieldhouse10,165
| 3–3
|- bgcolor="#bbffbb"
| 7
| November 12
| @ New Jersey
| 
| T. J. Ford (18)
| T. J. Ford (8)
| T. J. Ford (9)
| Izod Center13,551
| 4–3
|- bgcolor="#ffcccc"
| 8
| November 14
| Philadelphia
| 
| Danny Granger (18)
| Jeff Foster (11)
| T. J. Ford (7)
| Conseco Fieldhouse12,742
| 4–4
|- bgcolor="#ffcccc"
| 9
| November 15
| @ Chicago
| 
| T. J. Ford (16)
| Troy Murphy (13)
| Troy Murphy (5)
| United Center21,759
| 4–5
|- bgcolor="#bbffbb"
| 10
| November 18
| Atlanta
| 
| Danny Granger (34)
| Troy Murphy (19)
| Radoslav Nesterović, Jarrett Jack (5)
| Conseco Fieldhouse13,379
| 5–5
|- bgcolor="#ffcccc"
| 11
| November 21
| Orlando
| 
| Marquis Daniels (25)
| Troy Murphy (10)
| Radoslav Nesterović (8)
| Conseco Fieldhouse14,699
| 5–6
|- bgcolor="#ffcccc"
| 12
| November 22
| @ Miami
| 
| Marquis Daniels (25)
| Troy Murphy (11)
| Danny Granger, Troy Murphy (6)
| American Airlines Arena18,685
| 5–7
|- bgcolor="#ffcccc"
| 13
| November 25
| @ Dallas
| 
| Danny Granger (22)
| Troy Murphy (14)
| T. J. Ford (7)
| American Airlines Center19,996
| 5–8
|- bgcolor="#bbffbb"
| 14
| November 26
| @ Houston
| 
| Troy Murphy (21)
| Troy Murphy (14)
| Danny Granger (5)
| Toyota Center18,194
| 6–8
|- bgcolor="#ffcccc"
| 15
| November 28
| Charlotte
| 
| Danny Granger (35)
| Troy Murphy (12)
| T. J. Ford (6)
| Conseco Fieldhouse17,160
| 6–9
|- bgcolor="#ffcccc"
| 16
| November 29
| @ Orlando
| 
| Danny Granger (27)
| Troy Murphy (11)
| T. J. Ford, Jarrett Jack (5)
| Amway Arena17,172
| 6–10

|- bgcolor="#bbffbb"
| 17
| December 2
| L.A. Lakers
| 
| Danny Granger (32)
| Troy Murphy (17)
| T. J. Ford (8)
| Conseco Fieldhouse16,412
| 7–10
|- bgcolor="#ffcccc"
| 18
| December 3
| @ Boston
| 
| Danny Granger (20)
| Troy Murphy (10)
| T. J. Ford (8)
| TD Banknorth Garden18,624
| 7–11
|- bgcolor="#ffcccc"
| 19
| December 5
| @ Cleveland
| 
| Troy Murphy (15)
| Jeff Foster (7)
| Danny Granger (5)
| Quicken Loans Arena20,562
| 7–12
|- bgcolor="#ffcccc"
| 20
| December 7
| Boston
| 
| Marquis Daniels (26)
| Marquis Daniels, Jeff Foster (7)
| Danny Granger (6)
| Conseco Fieldhouse16,102
| 7–13
|- bgcolor="#ffcccc"
| 21
| December 10
| @ Toronto
| 
| Danny Granger (22)
| Troy Murphy (20)
| Troy Murphy (6)
| Air Canada Centre17,877
| 7–14
|- bgcolor="#ffcccc"
| 22
| December 12
| @ Detroit
| 
| Danny Granger (42)
| Troy Murphy (11)
| T. J. Ford (10)
| The Palace of Auburn Hills22,076
| 7–15
|- bgcolor="#ffcccc"
| 23
| December 13
| @ Milwaukee
| 
| T. J. Ford (27)
| Troy Murphy (11)
| T. J. Ford (6)
| Bradley Center14,921
| 7–16
|- bgcolor="#bbffbb"
| 24
| December 15
| @ Washington
| 
| Danny Granger (27)
| Troy Murphy (12)
| Marquis Daniels (7)
| Verizon Center14,502
| 8–16
|- bgcolor="#bbffbb"
| 25
| December 17
| Golden State
| 
| Danny Granger (41)
| Danny Granger, Brandon Rush, Jeff Foster (11)
| Danny Granger (6)
| Conseco Fieldhouse11,151
| 9–16
|- bgcolor="#ffcccc"
| 26
| December 19
| L.A. Clippers
| 
| Jarrett Jack (27)
| Jeff Foster (11)
| Jarrett Jack (7)
| Conseco Fieldhouse12,653
| 9–17
|- bgcolor="#bbffbb"
| 27
| December 20
| @ Philadelphia
| 
| T. J. Ford (25)
| Jeff Foster (10)
| Jarrett Jack (8)
| Wachovia Center14,599
| 10–17
|- bgcolor="#ffcccc"
| 28
| December 23
| New Jersey
| 
| Danny Granger (26)
| Jeff Foster (14)
| Jarrett Jack (8)
| Conseco Fieldhouse11,272
| 10–18
|- bgcolor="#ffcccc"
| 29
| December 26
| @ Memphis
| 
| Marquis Daniels (28)
| Troy Murphy (12)
| Jarrett Jack, Danny Granger (5)
| FedExForum12,346
| 10–19
|- bgcolor="#ffcccc"
| 30
| December 28
| New Orleans
| 
| Danny Granger (34)
| Troy Murphy (16)
| Jarrett Jack, Marquis Daniels (6)
| Conseco Fieldhouse14,374
| 10–20
|- bgcolor="#ffcccc"
| 31
| December 30
| Atlanta
| 
| Danny Granger (25)
| Troy Murphy (14)
| Danny Granger (5)
| Conseco Fieldhouse13,762
| 10–21

|- bgcolor="#bbffbb"
| 32
| January 2
| @ New York
| 
| Jarrett Jack (29)
| Troy Murphy (18)
| Danny Granger (6)
| Madison Square Garden19,763
| 11–21
|- bgcolor="#bbffbb"
| 33
| January 3
| Sacramento
| 
| Danny Granger (35)
| Troy Murphy (13)
| T. J. Ford (7)
| Conseco Fieldhouse12,765
| 12–21
|- bgcolor="#ffcccc"
| 34
| January 5
| @ Denver
| 
| Danny Granger (36)
| Troy Murphy (12)
| Jarrett Jack (7)
| Pepsi Center14,255
| 12–22
|- bgcolor="#bbffbb"
| 35
| January 7
| @ Phoenix
| 
| Danny Granger (37)
| Jeff Foster (9)
| Danny Granger (6)
| US Airways Center18,422
| 13–22
|- bgcolor="#ffcccc"
| 36
| January 9
| @ L.A. Lakers
| 
| Danny Granger (28)
| Troy Murphy (6)
| Jarrett Jack (8)
| Staples Center18,997
| 13–23
|- bgcolor="#ffcccc"
| 37
| January 11
| @ Golden State
| 
| Danny Granger (42)
| Jeff Foster (12)
| Jarrett Jack, T. J. Ford (6)
| Oracle Arena18,262
| 13–24
|- bgcolor="#ffcccc"
| 38
| January 12
| @ Utah
| 
| Danny Granger (30)
| Troy Murphy (10)
| Travis Diener (8)
| EnergySolutions Arena19,911
| 13–25
|- bgcolor="#bbffbb"
| 39
| January 14
| Detroit
| 
| Danny Granger (24)
| Troy Murphy (13)
| Jarrett Jack (6)
| Conseco Fieldhouse11,964
| 14–25
|- bgcolor="#bbffbb"
| 40
| January 16
| Toronto
| 
| Danny Granger (23)
| Troy Murphy (15)
| Jarrett Jack (7)
| Conseco Fieldhouse13,234
| 15–25
|- bgcolor="#ffcccc"
| 41
| January 19
| @ New Orleans
| 
| Danny Granger (30)
| Troy Murphy (11)
| Troy Murphy (5)
| New Orleans Arena17,237
| 15–26
|- bgcolor="#ffcccc"
| 42
| January 20
| @ San Antonio
| 
| Danny Granger (17)
| Troy Murphy (10)
| Radoslav Nesterović (4)
| AT&T Center18,181
| 15–27
|- bgcolor="#bbffbb"
| 43
| January 23
| Houston
| 
| Danny Granger (25)
| Troy Murphy (16)
| T. J. Ford (6)
| Conseco Fieldhouse14,486
| 16–27
|- bgcolor="#bbffbb"
| 44
| January 25
| Charlotte
| 
| Danny Granger (27)
| Troy Murphy (14)
| T. J. Ford (7)
| Conseco Fieldhouse10,936
| 17–27
|- bgcolor="#ffcccc"
| 45
| January 27
| @ Orlando
| 
| T. J. Ford (23)
| Troy Murphy (7)
| Travis Diener, Jarrett Jack, Mike Dunleavy, Jr. (4)
| Amway Arena17,461
| 17–28
|- bgcolor="#bbffbb"
| 46
| January 28
| Milwaukee
| 
| T. J. Ford (34)
| Troy Murphy (13)
| Jarrett Jack (6)
| Conseco Fieldhouse12,143
| 18–28
|- bgcolor="#bbffbb"
| 47
| January 30
| Miami
| 
| Mike Dunleavy, Jr. (30)
| Troy Murphy (12)
| Mike Dunleavy, Jr. (5)
| Conseco Fieldhouse14,031
| 19–28
|- bgcolor="#ffcccc"
| 48
| January 31
| New York
| 
| T. J. Ford (36)
| Troy Murphy (11)
| T. J. Ford (5)
| Conseco Fieldhouse15,067
| 19–29

|- bgcolor="#ffcccc"
| 49
| February 3
| Minnesota
| 
| Danny Granger (28)
| Troy Murphy (12)
| T. J. Ford (7)
| Conseco Fieldhouse11,015
| 19–30
|- bgcolor="#ffcccc"
| 50
| February 5
| @ Philadelphia
| 
| Mike Dunleavy, Jr. (21)
| Troy Murphy (14)
| T. J. Ford (7)
| Wachovia Center10,699
| 19–31
|- bgcolor="#bbffbb"
| 51
| February 6
| Orlando
| 
| Danny Granger (33)
| Jarrett Jack, Troy Murphy (8)
| T. J. Ford (5)
| Conseco Fieldhouse13,559
| 20–31
|- bgcolor="#ffcccc"
| 52
| February 8
| @ Washington
| 
| Danny Granger (29)
| Troy Murphy (10)
| T. J. Ford (7)
| Verizon Center13,708
| 20–32
|- bgcolor="#bbffbb"
| 53
| February 10
| Cleveland
| 
| Troy Murphy (18)
| Troy Murphy (15)
| T. J. Ford (4)
| Conseco Fieldhouse18,165
| 21–32
|- bgcolor="#ffcccc"
| 54
| February 11
| @ Milwaukee
| 
| Danny Granger (26)
| Troy Murphy (10)
| T. J. Ford (13)
| Bradley Center13,486
| 21–33
|- bgcolor="#bbffbb"
| 55
| February 17
| Philadelphia
| 
| Danny Granger (20)
| Danny Granger (10)
| T. J. Ford (7)
| Conseco Fieldhouse13,259
| 22–33
|- bgcolor="#ffcccc"
| 56
| February 18
| @ Charlotte
| 
| Jarrett Jack, Troy Murphy (18)
| Troy Murphy (16)
| Travis Diener (6)
| Time Warner Cable Arena12,374
| 22–34
|- bgcolor="#bbffbb"
| 57
| February 20
| @ Minnesota
| 
| Marquis Daniels (24)
| Troy Murphy (14)
| Travis Diener (6)
| Target Center13,777
| 23–34
|- bgcolor="#bbffbb"
| 58
| February 22
| Chicago
| 
| Troy Murphy (27)
| Troy Murphy (14)
| T. J. Ford, Jarrett Jack (5)
| Conseco Fieldhouse17,083
| 24–34
|- bgcolor="#ffcccc"
| 59
| February 23
| @ New York
| 
| Jarrett Jack (33)
| Troy Murphy (21)
| Troy Murphy (4)
| Madison Square Garden17,283
| 24–35
|- bgcolor="#bbffbb"
| 60
| February 25
| Memphis
| 
| T. J. Ford, Jarrett Jack (20)
| Troy Murphy (12)
| Jarrett Jack (6)
| Conseco Fieldhouse13,211
| 25–35
|- bgcolor="#ffcccc"
| 61
| February 27
| @ Boston
| 
| T. J. Ford (23)
| Troy Murphy (13)
| T. J. Ford, Marquis Daniels (4)
| TD Banknorth Garden18,624
| 25–36

|- bgcolor="#bbffbb"
| 62
| March 1
| Denver
| 
| Jarrett Jack (28)
| Troy Murphy (18)
| Jarrett Jack (8)
| Conseco Fieldhouse12,458
| 26–36
|- bgcolor="#bbffbb"
| 63
| March 3
| @ Sacramento
| 
| Jarrett Jack (26)
| Troy Murphy (10)
| T. J. Ford (9)
| ARCO Arena10,748
| 27–36
|- bgcolor="#ffcccc"
| 64
| March 4
| @ Portland
| 
| Marquis Daniels (28)
| Troy Murphy (13)
| T. J. Ford (5)
| Rose Garden20,020
| 27–37
|- bgcolor="#bbffbb"
| 65
| March 7
| @ L.A. Clippers
| 
| Jarrett Jack (25)
| Troy Murphy (15)
| T. J. Ford (8)
| Staples Center16,518
| 28–37
|- bgcolor="#ffcccc"
| 66
| March 10
| Utah
| 
| Troy Murphy (23)
| Troy Murphy (13)
| T. J. Ford (9)
| Conseco Fieldhouse13,705
| 28–38
|- bgcolor="#ffcccc"
| 67
| March 13
| @ Atlanta
| 
| T. J. Ford (29)
| Troy Murphy (14)
| T. J. Ford (5)
| Philips Arena14,079
| 28–39
|- bgcolor="#ffcccc"
| 68
| March 15
| @ Toronto
| 
| Troy Murphy (16)
| Troy Murphy (10)
| T. J. Ford (6)
| Air Canada Centre18,169
| 28–40
|- bgcolor="#ffcccc"
| 69
| March 18
| Portland
| 
| Danny Granger (35)
| Jeff Foster (11)
| T. J. Ford (6)
| Conseco Fieldhouse13,072
| 28–41
|- bgcolor="#ffcccc"
| 70
| March 20
| Dallas
| 
| Danny Granger (18)
| Danny Granger, Troy Murphy (11)
| Danny Granger, Travis Diener (4)
| Conseco Fieldhouse17,232
| 28–42
|- bgcolor="#bbffbb"
| 71
| March 21
| @ Charlotte
| 
| Jarrett Jack (31)
| Jarrett Jack (6)
| T. J. Ford (6)
| Time Warner Cable Arena15,721
| 29–42
|- bgcolor="#bbffbb"
| 72
| March 25
| Miami
| 
| Danny Granger (28)
| Jeff Foster (16)
| Jarrett Jack (4)
| Conseco Fieldhouse17,117
| 30–42
|- bgcolor="#ffcccc"
| 73
| March 28
| @ Chicago
| 
| Danny Granger (32)
| Jeff Foster (18)
| Jarrett Jack (9)
| United Center20,756
| 30–43
|- bgcolor="#bbffbb"
| 74
| March 29
| Washington
| 
| Danny Granger (31)
| Brandon Rush (10)
| T. J. Ford (10)
| Conseco Fieldhouse13,729
| 31–43
|- bgcolor="#bbffbb"
| 75
| March 31
| Chicago
| 
| Danny Granger (31)
| Troy Murphy (12)
| T. J. Ford (9)
| Conseco Fieldhouse15,687
| 32–43

|- bgcolor="#ffcccc"
| 76
| April 3
| San Antonio
| 
| Danny Granger (35)
| Troy Murphy (13)
| Jarrett Jack, T. J. Ford (6)
| Conseco Fieldhouse16,414
| 32–44
|- bgcolor="#bbffbb"
| 77
| April 5
| @ Oklahoma City
| 
| Danny Granger (24)
| Troy Murphy (9)
| T. J. Ford (5)
| Ford Center19,136
| 33–44
|- bgcolor="#bbffbb"
| 78
| April 8
| Toronto
| 
| Danny Granger (29)
| Troy Murphy (14)
| T. J. Ford (11)
| Conseco Fieldhouse13,647
| 34–44
|- bgcolor="#ffcccc"
| 79
| April 10
| @ Atlanta
| 
| Danny Granger (35)
| Troy Murphy (10)
| Jarrett Jack (7)
| Philips Arena17,222
| 34–45
|- bgcolor="#bbffbb"
| 80
| April 11
| Detroit
| 
| Danny Granger (24)
| Troy Murphy (13)
| Jarrett Jack (6)
| Conseco Fieldhouse17,116
| 35–45
|- bgcolor="#ffcccc"
| 81
| April 13
| Cleveland
| 
| Danny Granger (38)
| Troy Murphy (13)
| Jarrett Jack (5)
| Conseco Fieldhouse18,165
| 35–46
|-bgcolor="#ccffcc"
| 82
| April 15
| Milwaukee
| 
| Danny Granger (35)
| Troy Murphy (12)
| Jarrett Jack (10)
| Conseco Fieldhouse18,165
| 36–46

Player Statistics

Regular season

Player Statistics Citation:

Season Transactions

Trades

Free agents

Additions

Subtractions

References

Indiana Pacers seasons
Indiana
2008 in sports in Indiana
2009 in sports in Indiana